Yulara is a town in the southern region of the Northern Territory, Australia. It lies as an unincorporated enclave within MacDonnell Region. It is located in the Northern Territory electorate of Gwoja and the federal electorate of Lingiari.

History
By the early 1970s, the pressure of unstructured and unmonitored tourism, including motels near the base of Uluru (Ayers Rock), was having detrimental effects on the environment surrounding both Uluru and Kata Tjuta. Following the recommendation of a Senate Select Committee to remove all developments near the base of the rock and build a new resort to support tourism in the Uluṟu-Kata Tjuṯa National Park, the Commonwealth Government agreed in 1973 to relocate accommodation facilities to a new site outside the park.

After the Northern Territory was granted Self Government in 1978, the development of the new town became a major priority of the Northern Territory Government. Between 1978 and 1981, basic infrastructure (roads, water supply etc.) was built via the government's capital works program. In 1980 the government set up the Yulara Development Company Ltd to develop tourist accommodation, staff housing and a shopping centre. The first stage of the resort was built between 1982 and 1984 for the Northern Territory Government by Yulara Development Company Ltd., at a cost of A$130 million. The resort was designed by Philip Cox & Associates and won the Royal Australian Institute of Architects (RAIA) Sir Zelman Cowen Award in 1984.

When the new facilities became fully operational in late 1984, the Commonwealth Government terminated all leases for the old motels near the Rock, and the area was rehabilitated by the National Park Service (now called Parks Australia). Around the same time, the national park was renamed Uluṟu-Kata Tjuṯa, and its ownership was transferred to the local Indigenous people, who leased it back to the Parks Australia for 99 years.

There were originally three competing hotels, but that detracted from the viability of the enterprise, and the company (and indirectly the government) incurred massive operating losses. Between 1990 and 1992, the competing hotel operators were replaced by a single operator, the government-owned Investnorth Management Pty Ltd. In 1992, the government sold, through open tender, a 40% interest in the Yulara Development Company and, therefore, the resort, to a venture capital consortium.

In 1997, the entire resort was again sold by open tender to General Property Trust, which appointed Voyages Hotels & Resorts as operator. Voyages operated all aspects of the resort, with the exception of the post office (Australia Post). Almost all residents of the town rented their housing from Voyages, but the government leased some housing for its employees. Most residents are either workers in the resort or tour operators.  In 2011, the resort was sold again to the Indigenous Land Corporation which operates the resort under its subsidiary, Voyages Indigenous Tourism Australia.

Population
The 2016 Australian census found that Yulara had a population of 1,099 people which had the following characteristics:
 Aboriginal and Torres Strait Islander people made up 14.2% of the population. 
 52.8% of people were born in Australia and 62.6% of people spoke only English at home. 
 The most common response for religion was "No Religion" at 38.4%.

Transport

The resort is served by one major road, the Lasseter Highway, which links it to surrounding roads and landmarks. The Lasseter Highway is currently and until 2022 being expanded in the area to help with the tourism traffic flow. The sealed Lasseter Highway extends east to meet the Stuart Highway. The roads in other directions are not so well maintained or travelled. The Great Central Road leads west and southwest into Western Australia, but is generally only suitable for high clearance four-wheel drive vehicles.  Transit permits from Aboriginal Land Councils are required to travel west of Kata-Tjuta.

Climate
Yulara has a dry and arid climate (BWh) with long hot summers and short, cool winters, and with scant rainfall year-round. Frost may occur occasionally in some winter mornings.

See also
National Indigenous Training Academy

References

External links

 Satellite image from  Google Maps
 Nyangatjatjara College, Yulara

Populated places established in 1984
Towns in the Northern Territory
Unincorporated areas of the Northern Territory